Ewa Małgorzata Więckowska (born 29 December 1958 in Zabrze) is a Polish politician. She was elected to the Sejm on 25 September 2005, getting 7018 votes in 29 Gliwice district as a candidate from the Civic Platform list.

See also
Members of Polish Sejm 2005-2007

External links
Ewa Więckowska - parliamentary page - includes declarations of interest, voting record, and transcripts of speeches.

Members of the Polish Sejm 2005–2007
Women members of the Sejm of the Republic of Poland
Civic Platform politicians
1958 births
Living people
21st-century Polish women politicians